Malcolm Newlands (28 March 1925 – 10 February 1996) was a Scottish professional footballer who played as a goalkeeper.

Career
Born in Wishaw, Newlands played for Carluke Rovers, St Mirren, Preston North End and Workington.

References

1925 births
1996 deaths
Scottish footballers
Carluke Rovers F.C. players
St Mirren F.C. players
Preston North End F.C. players
Workington A.F.C. players
Scottish Football League players
English Football League players
Association football goalkeepers